Michael K. Smith is the current Secretary of the Agency of Human Services for the state of Vermont, a position he has held since October 2019 and previously held from January 2005 to January 2006.

He also served as Secretary of the Vermont Agency of Administration from 2006 to 2008. After leaving government service in 2008, he worked as the President of Vermont Operations for FairPoint Communications and as a radio and television commentator.

References

State cabinet secretaries of Vermont
Living people
Year of birth missing (living people)